The 2021 Incarnate Word Cardinals softball team represented the University of the Incarnate Word during the 2021 NCAA Division I softball season. The Cardinals played their home games at H-E-B Field and were led by fourth-year head coach Joe DiPietro. They were members of the Southland Conference.

Preseason

Southland Conference Coaches Poll
The Southland Conference Coaches Poll was released on February 5, 2021. Incarnate Word was picked to finish dead last in the Southland Conference at twelfth with 32 votes.

Preseason All-Southland team
No players from Incarnate Word were chosen to the All-Southland team

National Softball Signing Day

Roster

Coaching staff

Schedule and results

Schedule Source:
*Rankings are based on the team's current ranking in the NFCA/USA Softball poll.

References

Incarnate Word
Incarnate Word Cardinals softball
Incarnate Word Cardinals softball